Frédérick Falke (born 7 January 1973), known professionally as Fred Falke, is a French house and dance music producer and DJ.

Biography
Falke started out as a bass player before moving to production work. His first record, a collaboration with Alan Braxe named Intro, which sampled The Jets' 1987 hit "Crush on You", was released in 2000 on Vulture Music.

The pair would form a very productive partnership releasing a handful of singles and later making remixes for Goldfrapp, Röyksopp, Kelis, Justice, and others. The partnership would last until 2008 when they went their separate ways.

Falke has also collaborated with German producer and DJ Kris Menace, as well as releasing records on Menace's label Work It Baby. In addition, he has collaborated on various other productions with artists such as Savage, Miami Horror and Knightlife.

By himself, Falke has written and worked with Ellie Goulding, Amelia Lily, Florrie, Will Young, Gossip, Theophilus London, Nervo and Alexandra Burke. As a remixer, he has also worked for a number of rock and electronic artists such as Gossip, U2, Tiesto, Foxes, Grizzly Bear, Nero, Robyn, Uffie, Justice, Jamiroquai, Ladyhawke, Eric Prydz, Lykke Li, La Roux, Kesha, Bastille and Selena Gomez. Falke has done four official remixes with Jamiroquai: two as an individual, and two with Alan Braxe. Falke has also made many remixes with Xenomania.

Discography

Albums
 Part IV (5 December 2011)

Singles, EPs and collaborations

Producer and writer

Remixes by Fred Falke

Remixes by Alan Braxe & Fred Falke

References

External links
 Fred Falke on Myspace
 

French DJs
French house musicians
Living people
French electronic musicians
1973 births
Nu-disco musicians
French people of German descent
Xenomania
Electronic dance music DJs